KPXR-TV (channel 48) is a television station licensed to Cedar Rapids, Iowa, United States, broadcasting the Ion Television network to Eastern Iowa. It is owned and operated by the Ion Media subsidiary of the E.W. Scripps Company, and maintains offices on Blairs Ferry Road Northeast in Cedar Rapids and a transmitter near Walker, Iowa.

Technical information

Subchannels 
The station's digital signal is multiplexed:

References

External links
Official website

Ion Television affiliates
Grit (TV network) affiliates
Bounce TV affiliates
Laff (TV network) affiliates
Defy TV affiliates
TrueReal affiliates
E. W. Scripps Company television stations
Television channels and stations established in 1997
1997 establishments in Iowa
PXR-TV